Marilyn Isabelle Walker was a Canadian fibre artist, author, teacher and philanthropist. She was an active contributor to the arts and fine arts across Canada and at Brock University in particular. Born in the Niagara Peninsula in Southern Ontario, she was an influential figure in the Region and supporter in the revitalization of the arts. In 2003, she wrote a book called Ontario's Heritage Quilts, which celebrated the work of Ontario Quilters. In 2007, Marilyn Walker won the Mayors Patron of the Arts Award by the city of St. Catharines for her contributions to the area. She curated the first Canadian Contemporary Quilt Competition and also won the International Women's Day award in 2008. She delivered a speech to a majority but not exclusively female audience of 400 about determination in the face of adversity. In 2009, she received the Laura Sabia Award which recognizes a woman who has furthered the interest of arts in the community. Marilyn Walker is one of the most generous philanthropists in Canada. She has dedicated large amounts of time and resources to the revitalization of the arts in the Niagara. Her contributions to the Niagara Region has greatly improved the quality of life for the residence in the areas of education, arts, and health. Walker's donation to Brock University comes at a time when the value of arts has been diminishing. However, the donation brings hope to the revitalization of the arts, especially in the Niagara Region and St. Catharines. In 2009, she donated a total of $15 million to the development of the new Marilyn I. Walker School of Fine and Performing arts in downtown St. Catharines. As mayor Hazel McCallion of Mississauga, said "There’s lots of people who go through life and they’re not remembered, because they didn’t make contributions, Marilyn Walker, you have made a contribution that will be remembered." Walker died on October 1, 2015 at the age of eighty.

Textile work
Walker was known for her work in the textile industry as well as her contribution to bringing the importance of textile work and quilts to the public. Marilyn was an authority on Canadian quilts and other textiles and lectured all around Canada and the United States on the artistic, historical and significance of quilts. She was also the 1st president of the Niagara Quilters Association. Walker said "In quilting and in life, people should be allowed freedom of speech and freedom of art." She wrote a book in 2003 entitled Ontario's Heritage Quilts which celebrated the work of Ontario quilters.

References

Canadian women artists
Living people
Quilters
Canadian textile artists
Women textile artists
Year of birth missing (living people)